Hassan Askari Rizvi (SI), is a Pakistani political scientist and military analyst who served as caretaker Chief Minister of Punjab, Pakistan in 2018. He is noted for his work in comparative politics, nuclear weapons, and country's domestic policy.

He is currently serving as professor emeritus of political science at the Punjab University, Lahore as well. He also is a television personality and regularly appears on country's various news channels to comment on country's political and domestic situation. He also was a lecturer at the Virtual University of Pakistan. He is considered to have much experience working with international think tanks, universities, Pakistani and foreign news media.

Early life and career
Hassan Askari Rizvi, born in a Shia Family at Mandi Bahauddin, (Punjab, Pakistan) attended the Punjab University in Lahore where he studied political science, sociology, Urdu and English literature from 1960 to 1968. He gained BA (with honours) in Political science and English literature in 1968 from the Punjab University. In 1970, he attained MA in political science and proceeded his studies of United Kingdom. Rizvi received MPhil on the basis of publishing his thesis on South Asia and the Comparative government.

In 1979, he earned MA in international relations (IR) from the University of Pennsylvania, followed by PhD in political science from the University of Pennsylvania in 1980.

He was a visiting professor of Pakistan studies at the Columbia University from January 1996 to July 1999. He also served as the Allama Iqbal Professor at Heidelberg University of Germany from 1988 to 1991. Upon returning to Pakistan, he has regularly appeared on country's news channels to comment and discuss on country's nuclear weapons politics, national political and domestic situation of the Afghanistan and South Asia. He has spent over 35 years teaching and supervising research at the post-graduate level.

Chief ministership
He was nominated by the opposition Pakistan Tehreek-e-Insaf after they rejected their own previous nominee Nasir Mahmood Khosa on whom government of Shehbaz Sharif was in agreement. As a result, he was nominated as caretaker chief minister of Punjab by the Election Commission of Pakistan. Consensus on Rizvi could not be reached between government and opposition and the matter was decided by Election Commission of Pakistan. Pakistan Muslim League (N) is critical of this selection as according to them Rizvi has been very critical of their party's corruption. However, Hasan Askari has committed to ensure free and fair elections in the province.

Publications
A prolific author, "including more than 1,800 op-eds and comment pieces in domestic and international newspapers and magazines".

His books include:

Books

Awards and recognition
 Sitara-i-Imtiaz (Star of Excellence) by the Government of Pakistan in 2010.

References

External links
Quaid-i-Azam University Faculty
 Virtual University of Pakistan

Chief Minister of Punjab

Living people
People from Lahore
Punjabi people
Pakistani political scientists
Pakistani political writers
University of Pennsylvania alumni
Alumni of the University of Leeds
University of the Punjab alumni
Academic staff of Quaid-i-Azam University
Pakistani philosophers
Pakistani political commentators
Pakistani scholars of Pakistan studies
Pakistani military writers
Pakistani educators
Pakistani political consultants
1951 births
Chief Ministers of Punjab, Pakistan
Recipients of Sitara-i-Imtiaz